The COVID-19 pandemic in the Czech Republic is part of the worldwide pandemic of coronavirus disease 2019 caused by severe acute respiratory syndrome coronavirus 2. The first three confirmed cases in the Czech Republic were reported on 1 March 2020. On 12 March, the government declared a state of emergency, for the first time in the country's modern history for the area of the entire country. On 16 March, the country closed its borders, forbade the entry of foreigners without residence permits, and issued a nationwide curfew. While originally planned to be in effect until 24 March, the measures were later extended until 1 April and then again until the end of State of Emergency which was extended by the Chamber of Deputies until 30 April 2020 and then again until 17 May 2020.

Some measures undertaken by the Czech Republic differed in key aspects from other countries. A general curfew was in place between 16 March and 24 April, although with numerous exemptions. Apart from the permitting essential shopping and going to and from work, as in other countries, it also permitted visiting relatives and allowed for unrestricted movement in parks and open countryside. A general closure of services and retail sale was in place from 14 March until 11 May; however, all shops could conduct socially-distances sales with delivery through makeshift takeout windows and the gradual opening of selected shops started in several waves from 24 March onwards. Fear, anger, and hopelessness were the most frequent traumatic emotional responses in the general public during the first COVID-19 outbreak in the Czech Republic. The four most frequent categories of fear were determined: fear of the negative impact on household finances, fear of the negative impact on the household finances of significant others, fear of the unavailability of health care, and fear of an insufficient food supply. The government did not order the closure of manufacturing plants, but many did so voluntarily during the second half of March, with Hyundai spearheading a gradual reopening from 14 April.

The Czech Republic was the first European country to make the wearing of face masks mandatory from 19 March onwards. COVID-19 testing was made widely available with drive-through locations from 14 March, and from 27 March anyone with a fever, dry cough or shortness of breath was eligible for a free test. From 13 April onwards, COVID-19 testing capacity significantly surpassed demand. Contact tracing in the country also included voluntary disclosure of mobile phone position and debit card payments data for previous days and the quarantining of identified contacts. By 1 May 2020, altogether 257 COVID-19-related deaths were identified in the Czech Republic compared to 2,719 in similarly populous Sweden, which did not impose a full lockdown. However, Belgium, also with a similar population, had had 7,866 deaths at that time, despite having implemented an early and strict lockdown. The Czech Republic started gradually easing measures from 7 April 2020 onwards, with most restrictions being lifted by 11 May 2020.
However, by 17 November 2020, the Czech Republic had recorded a total of 6,416 COVID-19-related deaths compared to 6,344 in Sweden, surpassing Sweden's deaths count. By August 2021, the Czech Republic has recorded the fourth highest confirmed death rate in the world. There are some root causes speculated. A lockdown was decided in November 2020.

There was an ongoing discussion about vaccinations and its efficiency in the Czech public space. A 2022 study published in the Scientific Reports has shown the registered numbers of deaths in the Czech Republis is approx. “3.5 times lower than it would be expected without vaccination”. Authors of the study thus concluded that “vaccination is more effective in saving lives than suggested by simplistic comparisons”.

Background 
On 12 January 2020, the World Health Organization (WHO) confirmed that a novel coronavirus was the cause of a respiratory illness in a cluster of people in Wuhan City, Hubei Province, China, which was reported to the WHO on 31 December 2019.

The case fatality ratio for COVID-19 has been much lower than SARS of 2003, but the transmission has been significantly greater, with a significant total death toll.

Timeline January–July 2020

28 January
As of 28 January 2020, suspected cases were tested with negative results.

Week 9 (24 February – 1 March)
28 February –
As of 28 February 170 suspected cases were tested with negative results. 307 people were in home quarantine imposed by a regional health authority, 77 of them were in South Bohemian Region.

1 March –
The Minister of Health, Adam Vojtěch, reported that three cases of COVID-19 had been confirmed by the National Reference Laboratory. The three cases are treated at the Bulovka Hospital in Prague; one of the cases had been found in Ústí nad Labem, but was transported to the Bulovka Hospital. All cases were connected with northern Italy. One case was a man who returned from a conference in Udine, the second case was a woman (tourist, U.S. citizen) studying in Milan and the third case was a man who returned from a skiing holiday in Auronzo di Cadore.

Week 10 (2–8 March)
2 March –
Another case was confirmed, a woman who was on skiing holiday in Auronzo di Cadore and was staying in the same hotel as the man from a previous case.

3 March –
Another case was reported, a woman from Ecuador studying in Milano, a friend of the U.S. tourist who tested positive several days prior. Government started taking active measures (see policies section below).

5 March –
Four new cases were identified a Czech and an Italian who returned from Italy by the end of February, third was related to case No. 3 and fourth was related to case No. 6.

6 March –
Obligatory 14 days' quarantine for people returning from selected parts of Italy announced (see policies section below). As of 6 March 1,011 people were already in home quarantine imposed by regional health authority, 341 of them in Prague, 160 in South Bohemian Region and 63 in Central Bohemian Region. As of 6 March, some 16,500 Czechs were in Italy; spring break falls between early February and the middle of March 2020.

Week 11 (9–15 March)
9 March – Bulovka Hospital in Prague has announced that all but two tourists (from U.S. – case No. 2 and from Ecuador – case #5) have been released to home quarantine.

10 March –
Positive cases were being identified in ever increasing number of regions.

11 March –
Schools closed.

12 March –
The Czech government has declared a state of emergency for 30 days and adopted a number of measures (see policies section below).

13 March –
Brno University Hospital (a COVID-19 testing center) was hacked, disrupting services.

15 March –
Shortly before midnight, Prime Minister Andrej Babiš announced approval of the nationwide quarantine (see policies section below).

Week 12 (16–22 March)
16 March –
Starting at midnight, an hour after the nationwide quarantine declaration was approved the previous day, nearly 11 million Czech residents were placed under quarantine (see policies section below). The Czech Republic became one of the first countries in the EU to completely close its borders (with exemptions including international freight transport, see policies section below). First three people were reported recovered.

18 March –
The Czech Republic became the first country in the European Union to introduce mandatory face cover (see policies section below).

21 March –
Deliveries of protective gear purchased by Czech Government in China started: a heavy cargo plane Antonov An-124 Ruslan provided through NATO Support and Procurement Agency brought 100 tons of masks, respirators and coronavirus tests from China, while a China Eastern plane brought 7 million face masks. This helped to alleviate the shortage of personal protective equipment (PPE) in the Czech Republic. According to Security Information Service, the shortage happened after Chinese embassy conducted massive purchases of respirators available on Czech market during January and February and transferred them to China.

22 March –
First death reported: a 95-year-old man. While COVID-19 positive, at the time of death, the man was not at ICU and did not have pneumonia that is a COVID-19 specific type of death. The man had chronic heart issues and had also a pacemaker. The cause of death was formally established as a "complete exhaustion of organism".

Week 13 (23–29 March)
23 March –
The local health authority in the Moravian-Silesian Region announced that 80% of COVID-19 examinations that were conducted in the region in the previous days with use of fast-test kits that government procured and airlifted from China (altogether 300,000 kits bought by the Czech Government for total price of CZK 54 m—approximately US$2.1 m) came out wrong when double-checked through standard testing.
It was later confirmed the cause was an incorrect use where the fast-test react to an immune response and are not suitable for new patient screenings.

24 March –
A second death was reported: a 45-year-old man died after six days in a hospital in Havířov. The patient had had advanced cancer with metastases to multiple organs. The cause of death was established as multiple organ failure due to cancer but COVID-19 infection accelerated the patient's death.

A third death was reported: a 71-year-old woman died in Všeobecná fakultní nemocnice in Prague. The woman had the chronic obstructive pulmonary disease as well as other illnesses, so it wasn't immediately clear that she may be COVID-19 positive. Only after being hospitalised the woman informed doctors that her relative recently returned from Italy and was then tested for COVID-19. The woman was connected to a ventilator but died three days after start of hospitalisation.

Apart from the Uber driver on ECMO, there were 19 other patients in hospitals in serious condition, all of them connected to ventilators.

25 March –
The fourth and fifth deaths were reported: The fourth death was an 82-year-old from Prague with long-term chronic health problems. The fifth patient is an 88-year-old man from the Central Bohemian Region who was at home getting treatment and had a chronic disease.

A sixth patient died at Thomayer Hospital. The 75-year-old patient had diabetes and Parkinson's disease and also had advanced heart problems. The patient had been in the hospital since January and got infected while in post-operative care. After this patient tested positive for COVID-19, the hospital tested all 29 other patients in the same ward on 22 March, all negative. The test was repeated again on 25 March, this time with positive outcomes for 13 patients. Several of the hospital's staff had become infected earlier, probably while taking care of the Uber driver who would later become the first remdesivir receiver in the country. This patient was originally admitted with simple pneumonia without initial indication of COVID-19. Two of the infected nurses were hospitalised at the local pulmonary ward at the time of the sixth patient's death.

The government was planning to evacuate Czechs from Australia and New Zealand by the end of the week. Hundreds of Czechs still remained abroad, mainly in Oceania and Southeast Asia.

An Antonov An-124 Ruslan provided through the NATO Support and Procurement Agency arrived again with 24 tons of medical products purchased by the Czech government in China. The shipment included 52,600 protective suits, 70,900 protective glasses, 250,000 gloves, 1.16 million respirators and eight million masks. Further government purchased personal protection equipment shipments were planned for delivery with use of planes by the companies Smartwings and China Eastern Airlines, which were contracted for nine flights per week for six weeks in advance.
Commuters

Thirty-seven thousand and 13,000 Czechs live in the Czech Republic and work in Germany and Austria, respectively, large portion of that in healthcare. Cross-border workers (known as pendlers) were originally exempted from the complete travel ban. As Germany and Austria gradually became major centers of COVID-19 outbreak, the Government started tightening up rules for commuters. By 26 March, Czechs commuting to work in Austria and Germany were required to remain in those countries for at least 21 days. Upon return, they would be quarantined for 14 days. Czechs working in health, social services, and emergency services abroad were not subject to the new rules. The rules were eased from 14 April onwards (see policies section below).

Districts bordering Germany and Austria gradually became major centers of COVID-19 outbreak in the Czech Republic. Domažlice District reached the highest number of COVID-19 positive persons relative to population size in the country. According to Vice-prime Minister Czech government avoided closing the commuter loophole because German and Austrian healthcare system in areas close to the border is dependent on Czech commuters and also because government feared it could lead Slovakia to close access to Slovak commuters working in Czech healthcare. 
26 March –
A Taiwanese student in her twenties, who recently returned to Taiwan from the Czech Republic tested positive for coronavirus. She left the Czech Republic after 8 months in the country on 19 March 2020, announced symptoms (fever, diarrhoea) to Taiwanese authorities on 24 March and was diagnosed COVID-19 positive on 26 March 2020. Thirty-four patients were in severe condition.

27 March –
Despite having been quarantined already for two weeks, at least six retirement homes were hit by the spread of the COVID-19 virus. Authorities noted also the rising number of COVID-19 positive healthcare workers. As the capacity for COVID-19 testing increased, authorities eased requirements for free testing. Anyone with a fever, dry cough or shortness of breath may be eligible for a free COVID-19 test.

29 March –
Five people died. Among the victims was a 45-year-old nurse from Thomayer Hospital, an elderly woman from a senior home in Michle and an elderly woman from a senior home in Břevnice. There were 227 patients in hospitals, 45 of them in severe condition.

Week 14 (30 March – 5 April)
30 March –
In South Moravia, testing of the so-called "smart quarantine" was started: local travel history of infected persons were to be tracked using data from mobile phones and bank cards. Three hundred military personnel were deployed to reinforce local health authority for the purpose of tracing patients' contacts and collecting samples. If this approach is deemed successful by the authorities for diminishing the pandemic, the "smart quarantine" method is planned to replace the existing nationwide curfew policy. The city of Uherský Brod started thorough disinfection of all common areas of apartment buildings and public areas after a significant increase in COVID-19 infections. Health authority registered thirty new cases in the town. The Government also issued a decree for citizens to make cloth face masks for the nation.

31 March –
In a community of 72 people living in a retirement home in Litoměřice, 52 positive tests were confirmed.
Employees of the retirement home in Česká Kamenice decided to stay with their clients 24 hours a day until 15 April, to avoid the seniors getting COVID-19.

1 April –
One month ago the Czech Republic reported the first coronavirus case. A second senior from the Litoměřice retirement home died, as well as seniors from Prague and Moravia-Silesia. The Department of Infectious Diseases of the Central Military Hospital in Prague has treated COVID-19 patients with hydroxychloroquine. Eight of them have already been released for home quarantine. The evaluation of preliminary results of this therapy will be carried out in April. Chloroquine and hydroxychloroquine were originally used to treat malaria, but at present they also help patients with autoimmune diseases—rheumatoid arthritis or systemic lupus.
The World Health Organization (WHO) considers these substances as one of the options to treat COVID-19.

Supreme Administrative Court ruled that Government decision to postpone the Senate district 32 by-election due to COVID-19 pandemic was illegal. According to the court, the Government lacked the authority to make such a decision, as that can only be done by an Act of Parliament. The by-election to fill a seat after Jaroslav Kubera, who died of heart attack, was originally planned on 27 March and would take place on 5 June.

Czech aid to other countries
 China: On 17 February, a plane with 4.5 tons of personal protection equipment donated by Czech Government left from Vienna to China. The plane was also loaded with Hungarian, Slovak and Austrian PPE donations to China.
 China: On 1 March, a plane with 5 tons of PPE (including 780,000 pairs of gloves, 48,000 face masks and 6.800 protection suits) left from Prague to China. This time the load was donated by a multitude of parties, including President's Office, Olomouc Region, Karlovy Vary Region, South Moravian Region, Vysočina Region, the town of Třebíč and Škoda Auto. The donation was too large to fit into a single plane and thus there were further flights planned. Those, however, did not take place, as China declined to accept the aid.
 Italy: Czech Government donated 110,000 FFP2 respirators to Italy on 23 March. This donation took place after Czech authorities confiscated 680,000 respirators from a fraudster, who was stockpiling them in a warehouse in Lovosice. According to media, 110,000 of the confiscated respirators were originally sent from China as a donation to the 300,000 strong Chinese minority that lives in Northern Italy.
 Italy, Spain: 10,000 protective suits were donated to Italy and Spain each on 26 March (delivered on 30 March).
 Slovenia: One million face masks and 200,000 FFP2 respirators were donated to Slovenia on 1 April 2020.
 France: Czech Republic offered treatment of French COVID-19 patients in serious condition. First six patients were to be airlifted from France on 6 April and placed at University Hospital in Brno. On the day of the planned airlift, however, France declined the help, stating that it is now able to better deal with the pandemic on its own.
 North Macedonia: Czech Republic donated 1 million face masks on 12 April 2020.

Foreign aid to the Czech Republic
 Taiwan: Taiwan donated 25 lung ventilators to hospitals in the Czech Republic at the beginning of April 2020.
 Japan: Japan donated experimental drug Avigan (Favipiravir) for treatment of 20 patients with option to sell packages for further 80 patients on 9 April 2020.

2 April –
One victim died at the General University Hospital in Prague (VFN); another victim was a 79-year-old patient hospitalised at the Hradec Králové University Hospital. The government decided to extend the border control by 20 days. Border checks with Germany and Austria will last until midnight Friday, 24 April.

3 April –
A public controversy has arisen around shipments of personal protective equipment that the Czech Government purchased and airlifted from China. On 31 March, Mayor of Prague Zdeněk Hřib publicly praised Government of Taiwan for donating ICU ventilators to the Czech Republic, while pointing out that all of the equipment from China was purchased, none was donated. Representatives of China's business interest in the Czech Republic countered by claiming that China donated personal protective equipment that was to be handed over to Czech hospitals on 1 April. According to the media, Czech authorities received a promise of donation of PPE; however, none have reached the country by 3 April 2020.

4 April – There were 29 infected police officers in the Czech Republic, 343 more were in preventive quarantine.

Week 15 (6–12 April)
6 April – Government eased a number of restrictive measures, e.g. by opening outside sporting grounds (including skiing, shooting ranges, etc.), movement in parks and nature without face masks and opening of more shops and services (see policies section below).

7 April – Government sought extension of the State of Emergency for 30 days, i.e. until 12 May 2020. Chamber of Deputies of Parliament granted extension until 30 April 2020.

12 April – Government announced that it was preparing a plan for gradual lifting of remaining restrictions. Government aimed at reaching maximum of 400 newly infected people a day to prevent overburdening the healthcare system. Instead of general restrictions, the intended maximum number should be reached through contact tracing of positive cases (see policies section below).

Week 16 (13–19 April)
13 April – Number of COVID-19 tests sank from 8,000 a day to mere 3,200 a day during Easter weekend which included also Friday and Monday as state holidays. According to health authority, testing capacity during Easter weekend significantly surpassed demand for testing from potential patients. Health authority expected the demand to rise again in the following week.

14 April – A month-long complete border closure ended (see policies section below). A large number of Czech Romanis started returning from particularly hit United Kingdom, where many lived for over 15 years, leading to fear of possible increase of COVID-19 infection.

Hyundai factory in Nošovice, which makes 1,500 cars a day including Kona Electric, restarted production after three weeks' pause. Ten days later, Government exempted Korean Hyundai "specialists and key workers" needed for ramp up of electric vehicle production from cross-border and quarantine restrictions. Manufacturing plants were unaffected by Government restrictions; however, many had decided to close voluntarily.

The Czech government outlines a five-step plan for re-opening shops, restaurants and other businesses. Each subsequent step will be triggered as planned only if the previous step has not resulted in a total of 400 new COVID-19 patients per day. 
 20 April: Farmers markets, tradesmen with shops, car shops and showrooms, outdoor athletic areas for professionals, without spectators, Weddings of up to 10 people following hygiene rules
 27 April: Shops under 200 square metres in size, except for those in shopping centers over 5,000 square metres and those specified to open at a later date.
 11 May: Shops under 1,000 square metres in size, except for those in shopping centers over 5,000 square metres and those specified to open at a later date, Driving schools, Gyms and fitness centers (but not changing rooms or showers)
 25 May: Outdoor areas of restaurants, cafes, pubs, buffets, wineries and beer shops with outdoor sales and garden seating areas, barbershops, hairdressers, nail salons, tanning salons, cosmetic salons, massage parlors, museums, galleries, and art halls, zoos (outdoor areas only)
 8 June: All shops in shopping centers, shops over 1,000 square metres in size outside of shopping centers, indoor areas of restaurants, cafes, pubs, buffets, wineries and beer shops, hotels and other accommodation providers (and their restaurants and cafes), taxi services, tattoo and piercing studios, theatres, castles, chateaux and other cultural activities according to the current regulations, mass events for a specified number of people, cultural, business, and sports events for less than 50 people, weddings following specific hygienic protocol, indoor areas of zoos

The aforementioned timeline was not kept as government significantly accelerated lifting of restrictions in the following weeks, with most being lifted by 11 May.

Week 17 (20–26 April)
22 April – Prime Minister Andrej Babiš announced that the Government will not request the Chamber of Deputies of the Parliament to extend the State of Emergency beyond 30 April. Meanwhile, Minister of Interior announced that he will seek further discussion of the topic, claiming that State of Emergency is crucial for Government's ability to fast procure and distribute personal protection equipment outside of standard lawful procurement process.

23 April – The Municipal Court in Prague invalidated some of the restrictions adopted to battle the COVID-19 spread. In particular, the court invalidated Ministry of Health Protection Measures that introduced curfew, banned hospital visits and banned selected retail sale and services. The court held that such wide restrictions of basic rights may be adopted only under the Crisis Act by the Government as whole and not under Protection of Public Health Act by the Ministry of Health alone. Both the curfew and retail sale ban were originally adopted by Government Resolutions on 14 and 15 March, respectively; however, then they were replaced by Ministry of Health Protection Measures from 24 March onwards. The court invalidated these measures from 27 April onwards, giving the Government three days to remedy the situation. The Ministry of Health may lodge an appeal to the Supreme Administrative Court. On the day of court's decision, there were suits against 17 other measures still pending.

While Ministry of Health Protection Measures may be adopted indefinitely, Government Measures under Crisis Act may be adopted only for period of State of Emergency. Government may declare State of Emergency for period of 30 days, any prolongation requires assent of the Chamber of Deputies.

24 April – In line with the decision of the Municipal Court of Prague, the Government announced that it would seek Chamber of Deputies' consent to extend the State of Emergency until 25 May. At the same time the Government announced a faster roadmap for the lifting of restrictions.

Week 18 (27 April – 3 May)
28 April – The Government sought an extension of the State of Emergency until 25 May 2020. The Chamber of Deputies of Parliament granted an extension until 17 May 2020.

Week 19 (4–10 May)
6 May – The Ministry of Health presented the outcome of the COVID-19 prevalence study conducted over the previous weeks. Out of 26,549 people (volunteers and vulnerable groups with chronic diseases) tested for the presence of anti-bodies, the countrywide testing identified only 107 people with antibodies who were previously undetected. This showed a high success rate of contact tracing and quarantine measures and a very low rate of virus presence in the general population.

Week 20 (11–17 May)

State of Emergency ended on 17 May. Extraordinary measures either ended or were extended beyond the State of Emergency with lesser restrictions. According to Ministry of Health, the main aim going forward was to achieve three main objectives:
 Prevent hospital overcapacity in order to be able to provide necessary care to all patients with COVID-19, including non-hospitalised. The main aim is to preserve Czech COVID-19 mortality at 2–3% as before and to prevent its rise to worldwide average of 7% or French mortality of 18%.
 Prevent "explosive spread" of COVID-19 that would (a) include spread of more aggressive types of COVID-19 or (b) higher concentration of COVID-19 in body, as those lead to more dangerous development of illness.
 Further lower mortality as better knowledge about COVID-19 and use of promising experimental drugs like remdesivir and hydroxychloroquine becomes available.

A court ordered pre-trial detention of a first person charged with spreading of COVID-19. A 32-year-old woman was arrested for movement at a public space without a face mask, although she had been personally ordered to remain in quarantine. Despite quarantine order, the woman used a taxi and visited a shopping mall. The woman was jailed at a hospital ward of Brno prison. If convicted, she may be sentenced to up to 8 years' imprisonment.

Week 21 (18–25 May)
A new major COVID-19 hotspot emerged in the city of Karviná. Over 150 workers became infected at a black coal mine where miners work in tight shafts as deep as 1,000 metres underground. Authorities expected the number to significantly rise further as the workers' family members were likely to become positive later. Among those infected were also many foreign workers from Poland, where coal mines became hotspots in previous weeks. Health authority planned to conduct testing of all 2,400 workers within three days. Czech Army deployed six medical teams to assist local authority in collection of samples and contact tracing. As of 22 May, up to 40% of infected miners had no symptoms with many others reporting tiredness as the only symptom. Meanwhile, a school was temporarily closed down in nearby city of Havířov after a child of one of the miners tested positive. Apart from the coal mining hotspot, authorities deemed situation in the rest of the country as stable, except for Prague where they identified several small clusters with community spread.

Week 23 (1–8 June): Further lifting of restrictions, opening of borders
Most restrictions have been lifted. Borders were reopened and events of up to 500 people allowed.

Week 27 (27 Jun – 5 Jul)
1 July – OKD suspends mining in Karviná area following COVID-19 outbreaks. In the ČSM mines, 704 of the 3,403 employees tested were positive for COVID-19. That equates to 20.7 per cent, but the vast majority of them had no or only very mild symptoms of the disease.

Week 30 (20–26 Jul)
23 July – An outbreak of coronavirus linked to a music club in Prague has increased to 98 cases, including footballers from several of the city's clubs. Czech Republic reported 247 new cases on Wednesday, the highest number since a spike in late June in Karvina.

To combat an uptick in coronavirus cases in the country, Institute of Health Information and Statistics presented the Czech regional traffic light rating system, which has four levels.

Timeline August–October 2020

Week 35 (24–30 Aug)

27 August – UK removes Czech Republic from list of "green" countries. Travellers arriving from the Czech Republic will have to quarantine from 0400 hrs on Saturday, the UK Government has announced.

The Czech PM Andrej Babiš nixes the preventive face mask regulations established by Health Ministry, which were supposed to come in place when children return to school after the holidays on 1 September. Masks will now no longer be needed anywhere in schools, with the exception of schools that make it to the "orange" level of medium-risk for COVID-19 in the Czech Republic's regional health map.
Masks will need to be worn on public transport, inside healthcare environments, and polling stations.

Week 36 (31 Aug – 6 Sep)

1 September – 257 new cases reported. Mandatory to wear face masks on public transport, public indoor areas (such as shopping malls, offices, post offices, offices) and indoor public events, regardless of the number of visitors.
Schools are excluded from the restrictions.

Schools re-open across the country

Week 37 (7–14 Sep)

10 September – 1,161 new cases. Number of new cases has now exceeded 1,000 for the past two days.
face masks will be required in all indoor spaces throughout the Czech Republic from today.
There are a total of 25 exceptions to that requirement, including when eating or drinking in restaurants, exercising in gyms, or working in an office at least two meters away from others. Schools, kindergartens and playgrounds are excluded from restrictions

Belgium has placed Prague on its list of "red" risk zones, requiring a mandatory two-week quarantine on arrival for incoming travellers from the Czech capital.

Week 38 (14–20 Sep)

18 September – The Czech Republic reported more than 3,000 cases in a single day for the first time

The wearing of face masks is now mandatory in all interior spaces of universities.
Kindergartens and primary schools and playgrounds remain regularly open, where no face masks will be needed.

Week 39 (21–27 Sep)

21 September – Czech Health Minister Adam Vojtěch has unexpectedly announced his resignation.
Roman Prymula will become new Czech Health Minister.
Prymula predicted that the daily number of COVID-19 cases in Czech Republic will soon reach 6,000–8,000, after hitting a high of over 3,000 cases in the previous week.

25 September Ladislav Dušek, director of the Institute of Health Information and Statistics (ÚZIS), announced that in the first two weeks of September, almost 400 teachers in Czech schools became infected with COVID-19.
Dušek also stated that from the beginning of the epidemic until mid-September, workers in administration and engineering, the unemployed, and the self-employed were the groups that got infected most often.
The number of infected healthcare professionals has also grown significantly recently. According to data published by the Czech Medical Chamber, 259 physicians became infected up until 19 September. However, just a month earlier it was four people. Among nurses, the number of people infected increased from three to 433 from 20 August.

Week 41 (5–11 Oct)
5 October – The Czech Republic comes under a state of emergency. Indoor events with over 10 participants will be prohibited, the same applies to outdoor events with over 20 participants.
Professional sport matches will be without spectators and can be attended by a maximum of 130 athletes, coaches, and other members of the staff.
Concerts, theatre performances, and other artistic performances and festivals involving a significant amount of singing, including rehearsals are prohibited.
There is a 100-person limit on the attendance of religious services, at which singing is also prohibited.
Limit of 30 people for weddings and funerals
Restrictions will also apply to the number of people sharing one table at restaurants and other catering facilities as only six people at most will be allowed to sit at one table.
Educational facilities would follow the instructions of their regional public health authorities, which will issue measures depending on the situation in the region and in line with the epidemiological traffic light system.
A restriction on tuition in the form of a switch to distance learning is to apply to secondary and higher vocational schools and universities in regions with a red or amber.
Kindergartens and first stage primary schools remain regularly open, where no face masks will be needed.
The wearing of face masks is mandatory in all interior spaces of universities.
No restrictions on travelling were introduced

8 October – New record with 5,335 new COVID-19 cases reported in the Czech Republic. The Czech Republic overtook Spain as Europe's most-affected country.

The percentage of COVID-19 patients requiring hospitalisation rose above 4% for the first time in three months.

Secondary schools and universities have switched to distance learning but only in high-risk areas of the Czech Republic.
Visits and tours to zoos and all organised hobby, recreational and other clubs for children from 6 to 18 years old are banned.
Kindergartens and primary schools remain regularly open, where no face masks will be needed.

9 October – The Czech government announced new restrictions. Indoor sports facilities and culture venues will have to close for 2 weeks. Restaurants and other catering facilities will have to close as early as 8 pm. Dining establishments will be limited to 4 people at one table, and pupils in the upper level of elementary schools will alternate in-class and distance learning.

A group of shopping centers in Prague have decided to temporarily switch off their wifi in an attempt to stop students from gathering there.
Lower levels of elementary schools, kindergartens and playgrounds are not effected by the new restrictions and remain open, without face masks needed.

Week 42 (12–18 Oct)

12 October – The presence of students at universities will be prohibited, with the exception of clinical and practical teaching as well internships in study programmes for general medicine, dentistry, pharmacology and other healthcare study programmes. Measures were also taken on 12 October that were intended for elementary and secondary schools, but they were substantially changed the following day.

13 October – Czech government unveiled very strict anti-COVID measures. They will be valid for 14 days, starting from 14 October. The new measures include the closure of pubs and restaurants and a ban on public alcohol consumption. Pubs and restaurants may still operate on a delivery and takeaway basis. Takeaway windows can only operate until 8 pm. Additional measures are aimed at preventing people from gathering in public. They include a limit on group sizes to a maximum of six people. The requirement to wear a face mask in all train, tram, and bus stations is mandatory. All primary and secondary schools will switch to distance learning. The measures regarding schools will last through 1 November. Playgrounds and kindergartens remain open without any restrictions.

Police from the 11th General Crime Department of the First Police District in Prague uncovered an underground venue on Vodičková Street in central Prague operating after 8 pm, with around 35 guests packed into a cellar bar, who were drinking, dancing, and consuming drugs in late hours of the night.

15 October – A record 9,500 COVID cases out of a record amount of 30,894 performed tests.
Czech Railways restricts connections and will adjust the operation of long-distance trains beyond rush hours.
Prime Minister Andrej Babiš announced the government will start increasing the number of beds outside hospitals this weekend. Around 3,000 beds plus an additional 1,000 for specialised treatment. Locations the government is looking at are spa facilities around the country and a field hospital, to be built by the army, at the Letňany Exhibition Center.

18 October – A Sunday-afternoon demonstration against the Czech government's anti-coronavirus restrictions ended in dramatic clashes between protesters and the police after the rally was officially terminated. There were roughly 2,000 people at the rally. Several protesters were football fans who attempted to break through the police cordon. Resulting in 144 arrests and dozens of injuries

Week 43 (19–25 Oct)

20 October – Face masks again become mandatory at outdoor locations in cities, towns and villages where people are less than two meters apart. 
Within the Czech Republic, the highest rates of COVID-19 infection are now being reported in Zlín (798 cases per 100,000 residents over the past seven days), Plzeň-North (725 cases), and Prostějov (720 cases).
In Prague, there have been 501 COVID-19 cases per 100,000 residents over the past week.

21 October – Government have announced a new series of lockdown measures that will close most shops and services from the 22nd.
With the exception of grocery stores, drugstores, pharmacies, and other shops providing essential goods all retail stores in the Czech Republic must close as of 6:00 a.m. on Thursday morning, 22 October. The same applies to hairdressers, nail salons, and other venues providing similar services. Outside groups will be limited to a maximum of two, with the exception of family members from the same household. Only necessary travel should be undertaken, such as travelling to work or to buy food. The new measures will last until the end of the current state of emergency in the Czech Republic, on 3 November.
The new measures do not affect the operation of nurseries and kindergartens, which may remain open. All other schools in the Czech Republic have switched to distance learning.

23 October – The health minister Roman Prymula has been under fire to resign after a media report that he broke strict government restrictions and visited a Prague restaurant, which should have been closed following the restrictions set by his ministry. In the photographs, Prymula also didn't wear a mandatory mask.

Statistics

Cumulative cases

Nationwide

Daily cases

Medical care

Tests per day 
Tests per day (including repeated tests on the same person)

Development daily ratio (in%) of number of persons tested positive on the total number of tests performed 
Development daily ratio (in%) of number of persons tested positive on the total number of tests performed (including repeated tests on the same person)

Development of R ratio in the Czech Republic
Development of R ratio in the Czech Republic
*The reproduction number (R ratio) is a way of rating coronavirus or any disease's ability to spread. 
If the reproduction number is higher than one (1,0), then the number of cases increases exponentially
if the number is lower the disease will eventually stop spreading, as not enough new people are being infected to sustain the outbreak.

Overall statistics

Epidemic curve

Flattening the curve
The main priority of affected nations currently is to move to a slower doubling time of new cases, to ensure less crowded hospitals and therefore a lower case-fatality rate.

Governments of different countries take different approaches to flatten the epidemic curve. Beside travel bans and isolation of complete communities, citizens are also often requested to stay at home and keep social distance.

Research indicates that measures must be applied rigorously and immediately to be effective. Also, the national community's commitment to supporting/tolerating the restrictions and following the advice of health authorities plays an important role in the success of flattening the epidemic curve and limiting the spread of the virus.

For example, in South Korea mass testing efforts were successful. The South Korean national testing capacity reached 15,000 tests per day. Compared to population size, the Czech Republic reached the same rate of testing on 23 March 2020. The Ministry of Interior in South Korea also rolled out a smartphone app that can track the quarantined and collect data on symptoms, so scientists are able to see more epidemiological data.

Curve comparison

Comparing cumulative numbers of confirmed cases in selected countries, including the Czech Republic, shows the different curves of the epidemic in different countries. The chart shows the number of known cases and the pace at which the number increases on a logarithmic scale. The actual number of people infected may be and likely is, significantly higher, as only cases where the virus was confirmed by laboratory testing are shown. Many cases may only have an asymptomatic or mildly symptomatic course of the disease and never seek treatment. In yet others, the infection may still be in the incubation period, when it is asymptomatic and may not yet be detectable even by testing.

*Datasource: Wikipedia

COVID-19 Epidemic curve selected countries per 1M pop. (Linear scale / from the 100th case)
*Datasource: Wikipedia

Czech restriction actions:/ Day 0: Schools closed / Day 2: State of Emergency: close of sport facilities & close restaurants & bars at 8pm, border control, travel restrictions, ban 30+ events /Day 3: Criminalize spreading virus on purpose/Day 4: Complete closure all shops restaurants & bars excl. food shops, petrol, pharmacies/Day 5: Nationwide quarantine excl. shopping, employment need/ Day 6: Borders closed&closure municipalities in Olomouc region/ Day 8: Mandatory nose&mouth cover/ Day 9: Special 7–9 shop-opening hours for seniors/ Day 10: Changed special 8–10 shop-opening hours for seniors.

Czech eased restriction actions:/Day 20: Lifted closure municipalities in Olomouc region/ Day 27: Ease movement rule in parks & nature without face mask and opening some outside sporting grounds/ Day 35: Eased conditions of entry to the territory of the Czech Republic/Day 40: reopening farmers markets & small stores

Case details

Detailed information was reported regarding most of the first 99 cases, up to 12 March 2020:

Policies to fight the contagion

Interpersonal solidarity

The COVID-19 pandemic in the Czech Republic has created a wave of solidarity in a variety of areas, including:
 Due to the lack of protective face masks, volunteers sewed masks for other people and also shared instruction videos online.
 Programmes were launched to help the most vulnerable groups and seniors, on a non-commercial basis, by buying food and medicines.
 On Monday, 23 March, Czech National Television launched a temporary new television channel ČT3, which is to bring practical advice, news and a selection of ČT's classic programmes from the archive for older people.
 Throughout the nation, people made so-called 'mask-trees' to share face coverings.
 The Vietnamese community in the Ústí nad Labem region raised CZK 140,000 for a donation of a ventilator to a hospital in Ústí nad Labem
 Due to the closure of Czech schools, Czech National Television launched an educational programme for home education. The "UčíTelka" programme is focusing on teaching first-grade pupils. The programmes "Odpoledka" on teaching second-grade pupils and programme "Škola doma" for ninth-grade pupils preparing them for entrance exams to secondary schools.
 Czech manufacturer of 3D printers Prusa Research contributed to the "free use project" of shared bicycles company Rekola to enable access to transport with a lower risk of virus transmission than public transport. Prusa Research also designed, produced and distributed protective face shields for medical professionals.
 The Žufánek family distillery from Boršice will produce and distribute for free disinfectant gels without the necessary permit from the health and agriculture department.

Gallery

See also
 COVID-19 pandemic in Europe
 COVID-19 pandemic by country and territory
 Healthcare in the Czech Republic

References

External links
 COVID-19 epidemic (Ministry of Healthcare, in English), mzcr.cz
 COVID-19 statistics (Ministry of Healthcare), mzcr.cz
 Epidemic curve in countries including the Czech Republic, datawrapper.de
 Interactive map of COVID-19 situation in the Czech Republic, covid-19-cz.chcepe.now.sh
 Coronavirus COVID-19 Global Cases and historical data by Johns Hopkins University
 Wikiversity:COVID-19/All-cause deaths/Czechia -- charts

 
Czech Republic
Czech Republic
Disease outbreaks in the Czech Republic
2020 disasters in the Czech Republic
2021 disasters in the Czech Republic